The Cleveland Guardians are a professional baseball franchise based in Cleveland, Ohio that formed in 1901. They are members of the Central division of Major League Baseball's American League. The current manager of the Guardians is Terry Francona, who replaced Manny Acta after the end of the 2012 season.

The Guardians have had 46 managers in their history. Jimmy McAleer became the first manager of the then Cleveland Blues in 1901, serving for one season. In 1901, McAleer was replaced with Bill Armour. The Guardians made their first playoff appearance under Tris Speaker in 1920. Out of the six managers that have led the Guardians into the postseason, only Speaker and Lou Boudreau have led the Guardians to World Series championships, doing so in 1920 and 1948, respectively. Al López (1954), Mike Hargrove (1995 and 1997) and Terry Francona (2016) have also appeared in World Series with the Guardians. The highest winning percentage of any manager who managed at least one season was López, with a percentage of .617. The lowest percentage was Johnny Lipon's .305 in 1971, although he managed for only 59 games. The lowest percentage of a manager with at least one season with the Guardians was McAleer's .397 in 1901.

Francona has managed more regular season games (1516) than any other Guardians manager. Francona is also the winningest manager in Guardians history, with 845 wins as of the 2022 season. Charlie Manuel, Eric Wedge, Speaker, Boudreau, López, Hargrove and Francona are the only managers to have led the Guardians into the playoffs. Speaker, Boudreau, López, Walter Johnson, Joe Gordon, Nap Lajoie and Frank Robinson are the seven members of the Baseball Hall of Fame who are also former managers of this club. Of those seven, López is the only one inducted as a manager. Wedge became the first Guardians manager to win the Manager of the Year award, in 2007.

Table key

Managers
Statistics current through the 2022 postseason.

See also

Cleveland Guardians all-time roster
List of Cleveland Guardians owners and executives
List of Cleveland Guardians seasons

Notes
 A running total of the number of managers of the Guardians. Thus, any manager who has two or more separate terms is counted only once.

References

External links

 
Cleveland Guardians
Managers